The 1981 San Francisco 49ers season was the franchise's 32nd season in the National Football League (NFL), their 36th overall and their third under head coach Bill Walsh.

The team finished the regular season with a 13–3 record. (Their first winning season in 5 years (1976)) The season was one of the franchise's most successful seasons to that point and was considered to be "the birth of a dynasty", when the 49ers began a decade of dominance over much of the NFL. The 49ers drew an average home attendance of 54,398 in the 1981 NFL season.

The 49ers won Super Bowl XVI by defeating the AFC Champion Cincinnati Bengals. It was the first of five Super Bowl victories in franchise history, all within the next 13 seasons. From 1981 to 1997, the 49ers would have 13 NFC West titles, 8 NFC top seeds, and 7 seasons as the NFL's best team.

Quarterback Joe Montana began the 1981 season as San Francisco's starting quarterback. Montana produced two fourth-quarter comeback victories. Montana's signature game of the season was the NFC Championship Game, which culminated in "The Catch", a last-minute touchdown pass from Montana to Dwight Clark, propelling the 49ers to victory over Dallas, and a berth in their first Super Bowl. The 49ers were undefeated in Super Bowls until Super Bowl XLVII.

Offseason

NFL Draft 
A turning point for the franchise was the drafting of safety Ronnie Lott from the University of Southern California. Lott would be inducted into the Pro Football Hall of Fame.

Training Camp 
The 1981 San Francisco 49ers season held training camp at Red Morten Park in Redwood City, California.

Personnel

Staff

Roster

Preseason

Schedule

Regular season 
With the offense in good shape, Walsh and the 49ers focused on overhauling the defense in 1981. Walsh took the highly unusual step of overhauling his entire secondary with rookies and untested players, bringing on board Ronnie Lott, Eric Wright and Carlton Williamson and giving Dwight Hicks a prominent role. He also acquired veteran linebacker Jack "Hacksaw" Reynolds and veteran defensive lineman and sack specialist Fred Dean.

These new additions, when added to existing defensive mainstays like Keena Turner, turned the 49ers into a dominant team. After a 1–2 start, the 49ers won all but one of their final games to finish with a 13–3 record, easily the best record in the team's history. Additionally, the 49ers defense yielded more than 20 points in only three games. Dean and Hicks made the Pro Bowl. The 49ers selection of Lott in the 1981 NFL Draft proved to be a seminal one. In addition to making the NFC Pro Bowl roster, Lott was voted First-Team All-Pro and received nods from all 5 newspapers that voted, a significant honor for a rookie. Giants' linebacker Lawrence Taylor was the only other rookie from the 1981 NFL Draft to achieve this unanimous selection to the First Team All-Pro unit.

Led by Montana, the unusual offense was centered around the short passing game, which Walsh used as ball control. Both Dwight Clark and Freddie Solomon had excellent years receiving; Clark as the possession receiver, and Solomon as more of a deep threat. The 49ers running game, however, was among the weakest for any champion in NFL history. Ricky Patton led the 49ers with only 543 yards rushing. The 49ers' most valuable running back, however, might have been Earl Cooper, whose strength was as a pass-catching back (he had 51 catches during the season).

Schedule

Game summaries

Week 1 at Detroit Lions

Week 2 vs. Chicago Bears

Week 3 at Atlanta Falcons 

Joe Montana was intercepted twice in 34 passes (24 completed) as the Niners fell to the Falcons for the eleventh time in the last eight seasons.

Week 4 vs. New Orleans Saints

Week 5 at Washington Redskins 

{{Americanfootballbox
|titlestyle=text-align:center;  text-align:center;
|state=autocollapse
|title=Week Five: San Francisco 49ers at Washington Redskins – Game summary
|date=October 4
|time=10:00 a.m. PDT
|stadium=RFK Stadium, Washington, D.C.
|attendance=51,843
|weather=; wind 10
|referee=Gordon McCarter
|TV=CBS
|TVAnnouncers=Tom Brookshier (play-by-play), Roger Staubach (color commentator)

|road=49ers|R1=14|R2=10|R3=6|R4=0
|home=Redskins|H1=0|H2=3|H3=0|H4=14

 |reference=Pro-Football-Reference.com
 |scoring=
First quarter
 SF – Ricky Patton 16-yard rush – (Matt Bahr kick) 49ers 7–0
 SF – Dwight Hicks 80-yard fumble return – (Matt Bahr kick) 49ers 14–0
Second quarter
 SF – Matt Bahr 43-yard field goal – 49ers 17–0
 WSH – Mark Moseley 34-yard field goal – 49ers 17–3
 SF – Johnny Davis 1 yard run – (Matt Bahr kick) 49ers 24–3
Third quarter
 SF – Dwight Hicks 32-yard interception return – (kick failed) 49ers 30–3Fourth quarter WSH – Mike Nelms 58-yard punt return – (Mark Moseley kick) 49ers 30–10 WSH – Joe Washington 5-yard rush – (Mark Moseley kick) 49ers 30–17|stats=Top passers SF – Joe Montana, 15/28, 193 Yds, 1 Int
 WSH – Joe Theismann, 10/22, 123 Yds, 2 IntsTop rushers SF – Ricky Patton, 9 Car, 43 Yds, 1 TD
 WSH – John Riggins, 13 Car, 47 YdsTop receivers SF – Lenvil Elliott, 6 Rec, 69 Yds
 WSH – Joe Washington, 8 Rec, 49 YdsTop tacklers SF -
 WSH -Turnovers SF – 2
 WSH – 6
}}

 Week 6 vs. Dallas Cowboys 

 Week 7 at Green Bay Packers 

 Week 8 vs. Los Angeles Rams 

 Week 9 at Pittsburgh Steelers 

 Week 10 vs. Atlanta Falcons 

 Week 11 vs. Cleveland Browns 

The Niners’ winning streak ended in a battle of six combined field goals. Opposing quarterbacks Brian Sipe and Montana combined for 393 yards, three interceptions, and an average passer rating of 56.

 Week 12 at Los Angeles Rams 

The game lead tied or changed eight times as the Rams wound up using quarterbacks Dan Pastorini and Pat Haden while running back Mike Guman threw a seven-yard touchdown to Preston Dennard. Amos Lawrence opened the third quarter by scoring on the opening kickoff and Ronnie Lott scored after intercepting Pastorini.

 Week 13 vs. New York Giants 

 Week 14 at Cincinnati Bengals 

 Week 15 vs. Houston Oilers 

 Week 16 at New Orleans Saints 

 Game officials 

 Preseason 

 Regular season 

 Standings 

 Final statistics 

 Statistical comparison 

 Quarter-by-quarter 

 Individual leaders 

1Completions/attempts
2Carries
3Long gain
4Receptions
5Interceptions
6Punts
7Kickoff Returns
8Punt Returns

 Postseason 

 NFC Divisional Playoff 
The Giants were making their first appearance in the postseason since 1963. First-year starting quarterback Joe Montana led the 49ers to victory in his debut playoff game, completing 20 of 31 passes for 304 yards and 2 touchdowns, with 1 interception. His top target in the game was receiver Dwight Clark, who caught 5 passes for 104 yards.

 NFC Championship Game 

The 49ers were making their third appearance in the NFC Championship Game. Their opponent was their opponent for the two previous NFC Championship Games-the Dallas Cowboys. In both previous matches, the 49ers had lost the game. The game is remembered for "The Catch".

The play, remembered in 49er lore as "Red Right Tight—Sprint Right Option" had called for both the primary receiver, Solomon, and Dwight Clark to line up on the right. Montana was supposed to roll to his right and find Solomon. Clark's pattern called for him to cut left across the end zone, stop, and immediately reverse his path to the right. If Solomon were covered, it would be up to Montana to find Clark. Due to the pressure, Montana's pass was high, but Clark was in position to make his memorable grab. Future New England Patriots/Tampa Bay Buccaneers quarterback Tom Brady, who grew up in the Bay Area, attended the game as a four-year-old. The 49ers were victorious despite an astonishing six turnovers, including three interceptions by Joe Montana.

A photograph of the catch, with Clark at the height of his leap and Everson Walls reaching out to try to block the ball, was featured on the cover of Sports Illustrated the following week.

 Super Bowl XVI 

 Game officials 

 Awards and records 
 Joe Montana, Super Bowl Most Valuable Player
 Bill Walsh, National Football League Coach of the Year Award

 1982 AFC-NFC Pro Bowl 

 Media Pre season Local TVLocal Radio'''

References

External links 
 49ers on Pro Football Reference
 49ers Schedule on jt-sw.com

San Francisco 49ers seasons
San Francisco
NFC West championship seasons
National Football Conference championship seasons
Super Bowl champion seasons
1981 in San Francisco
San